Zahida Khan is an Indian politician from Indian National Congress. She is Minister Of State in Government of Rajasthan and Member of Rajasthan Legislative Assembly.
 She got elected as an MLA from Kaman, Rajasthan first in 2008 and then again in 2018. She has also served as the Parliamentary secretary, State Minister, Government of Rajasthan. She was also appointed General Secretary of All India Mahila Congress in October 2011.

References

Further reading 
 KAMAN Election Result 2018, Winner, KAMAN MLA, Rajasthan
 Kaman Election Result 2018 Live Updates: Zahida Khan from Congress Wins
 Kaman Rural Assembly constituency (Rajasthan): Full details, live and past results
 Zahida Khan INC Candidate 2018 विधानसभा चुनाव परिणाम Kaman

External links 

Living people
Rajasthani politicians
Women members of the Rajasthan Legislative Assembly
Indian National Congress politicians
1968 births
Rajasthan MLAs 2018–2023
Indian National Congress politicians from Rajasthan
21st-century Indian women politicians